Paamiut Airport  is an airport located  northeast of Paamiut, a town in the Sermersooq municipality in southwestern Greenland. It was built in 2007, replacing the old heliport. It is the only airport between Nuuk and Narsarsuaq capable of serving STOL aircraft of Air Greenland.

Airlines and destinations

References 

Airports in Greenland